Otto Antoine (22 October 1865, Koblenz - 14 July 1951, Unteruhldingen) was a German cityscape painter and commercial artist, in the Impressionistic style.

Life and work 
 
He was born to Georg Antoine, a watchmaker, and his wife, Marie née Roesgen. While still very young, he displayed an aptitude for art, and was apprenticed to a local painter after completing his secondary education. Economic circumstances prevented him from pursuing that goal so, at the age of eighteen, he entered the civil service and became a clerk at the post office in the  district of Koblenz. He continued to practice drawing and painting after work, and was often assigned to do calligraphy, due to his elegant handwriting.

When the Secretary of the Post Office, Heinrich von Stephan, became aware of his talent, arrangements were made for him to study in Berlin. He went there in 1891, enrolled at the Prussian Academy of Art, and studied landscape painting. His most influential instructor was Franz Skarbina.

In 1902, he was appointed an assistant at the Postal Museum; selecting, processing and copying images for inclusion. Occasionally, he helped to oversee their postage stamp collection. For many years, he was allowed to use his office as a studio for his own artwork which, by then, consisted almost entirely of Berlin cityscapes. In addition to painting, he was a talented graphic artist; designing New Years cards, invitation cards, advertisements and more.

Only four years later, the reorganization following hyperinflation  eliminated that position. He retired in 1930. Under pressure from the Nazi government, his style after 1933 became more realistic, as did that of most artists. In 1935, he visited one of his daughters in Chicago, and drew sketches of the city.

In 1942, his home and studio, where he had lived for forty years, was bombed, so he and his wife went to live in Silesia. Many of his works were destroyed then, or lost later. They settled in a small village on Lake Constance in 1944, where he continued to paint, and he died there in 1951, aged eighty-five. His remains were taken to Berlin and interred at the Friedhof Wilmersdorf. Even now, there is no complete list of his surviving works, or where they are located.

References

Further reading 
 Hübner, Hans: "Der Maler von Berlin und Postmaler Otto Antoine (1865–1951)", In: Post- und Telekommunikationsgeschichte, DGPI, Vol.2/2001.
 "Otto Antoine – Berlin wie es war – Ölbilder und Aquarelle", exhibition brochure, 15 November-10 December 1950, Haus am Waldsee.
 Rudolf Pfefferkorn: "Otto Antoine – Das alte Berlin im Bild – Gemälde und Aquarelle", exhibition catalog, 21 January-5 March 1966, Rathaus Wedding

External links 

 More works by Antoine @ ArtNet

1865 births
1951 deaths
19th-century German painters
German genre painters
Cityscape artists
German civil servants
Prussian Academy of Arts alumni
Artists from Koblenz
20th-century German painters